Isospidia brunneola is a moth in the family Drepanidae. It was described by William Jacob Holland in 1893. It is found in Cameroon, the Democratic Republic of the Congo, Gabon and Sierra Leone.

References

Moths described in 1893
Drepaninae